Heiko Hell (born 5 May 1980) is a German former swimmer, who specialized in long-distance freestyle events. He is a nine-time German swimming champion in the 400, 800, and 1500 m freestyle (2000–2004), and also a three-time Olympic finalist. Hell is a member of Hamburg City Swimming Club, and is coached and trained by Dirk Lange.

Hell made his official debut at the 2000 Summer Olympics in Sydney with a three-event program. On the first day of the Games, Hell missed a spot for the top 8 final of the 400 m freestyle, finishing in ninth place with a time of 3:50.80. He also competed for the sixth-place German team in the preliminary heats of the men's  freestyle relay. Teaming with Michael Kiedel, Christian Keller, and Stefan Herbst, Hell swam the lead-off leg and recorded a time of 1:50.48. In his last event, 1500 m freestyle, Hell finished outside the medals in eighth place by more than 10 seconds behind Ukraine's Igor Chervynskiy in 15:19.87.

At the 2004 Summer Olympics in Athens, Hell shortened his program, swimming only in the 400 m freestyle. He finished first ahead of his teammate Christian Hein from the Olympic trials, in a FINA A-standard of 3:51.48. On the first morning of the Games, Hell placed eighteenth in the preliminaries. Swimming in heat four, he raced to fifth place by a 4.55-second margin behind winner and defending Olympic silver medalist Massimiliano Rosolino of Italy, outside his entry time of 3:52.06. He also teamed up with Jens Schreiber, Lars Conrad, and Christian Keller in the  freestyle relay. Swimming the second leg, Hell recorded a split of 1:49.15, but the Germans pulled off again with a sixth-place effort, in a final time of 7:16.51.

References

External links
Profile – German Swimming Federation 

1980 births
Living people
People from Pinneberg
German male swimmers
Olympic swimmers of Germany
Swimmers at the 2000 Summer Olympics
Swimmers at the 2004 Summer Olympics
German male freestyle swimmers
Sportspeople from Schleswig-Holstein
20th-century German people
21st-century German people